The Loser Man is a 2022 Iranian drama film directed by Mohammad Hossein Mahdavian and written by Mahdavian, Ebrahim Amini and Hossein Hassani. 
The film screened for the first time at the 40th Fajr Film Festival and earned 2 nominations.

Premise 
Ahmad Khosravi (Javad Ezzati), in the midst of his busy personal life, becomes responsible for handling mysterious cases. A case whose discovery process confuses Ahmed with his doubts and worries and affects his life.

Cast 

 Javad Ezzati as Ahmad Khosravi
 Rana Azadivar as Somayeh
 Babak Karimi as Rasul
 Anahita Dargahi as Bahar
 Mahdi Zaminpardaz as Hessam
 Majid Norouzi as Ardalan
 Amir Hossein Hashemi as Raefipour
 Amir Dezhakam as Azimi
 Sajjad Babaei as Sina
 Hojjat Hassanpour Sargaroui as Abozar
 Manouchehr Alipour as Shahab's Uncle
 Shabnam Ghorbani as Marzieh
 Venus Kanly as Sara
 Melika Pazouki as Mahtab

Reception

Accolades

References

External links
 

2020s Persian-language films
2022 drama films
2022 films